Brenthis is a butterfly genus of the family Nymphalidae.

Species

References
BioLib.cz
"Brenthis Hübner, [1819]" at Markku Savela's Lepidoptera and Some Other Life Forms

External links
Images representing Brenthis at Consortium for the Barcode of Life
Images representing Brenthis at Encyclopedia of Life

Argynnini
Nymphalidae genera
Taxa named by Jacob Hübner